Each One Teach One is a 2002 double album by Oneida. Prefix magazine described the record as "[a] sprawling monster of an album...equal parts compelling and difficult."

Track listing

Disc one
"Sheets of Easter" (14:13)
"Antibiotics" (16:37)

Disc two
 "Each One Teach One" (3:25)
 "People of the North" (4:30)
 "Number Nine" (2:54)
 "Sneak into the Woods" (1:59)
 "Rugaru" (6:34)
 "Black Chamber" (3:07)
 "No Label" (4:58)

References

2002 albums
Oneida (band) albums